Mimas is a genus of moths in the family Sphingidae first described by Jacob Hübner in 1819.

Species
Mimas christophi (Staudinger 1887)
Mimas tiliae (Linnaeus 1758)

Gallery

References

Smerinthini
Moth genera
Taxa named by Jacob Hübner